Bull Run or Bullrun may refer to:

Military
 First Battle of Bull Run (First Manassas), 1861, the first major battle of the American Civil War 
 Second Battle of Bull Run (Second Manassas), 1862, a later battle also at Bull Run
 Operation Bull Run, a military operation of the Iraq War and part of Operation Marne Torch
 Bullrun (decryption program), a secret anti-encryption program run by the US National Security Agency (NSA)
 USNS Bull Run (T-AO-156), an oil tanker

Places in the United States

Virginia
 Bull Run (Occoquan River tributary), a stream in Fairfax, Loudoun, and Prince William counties, site of the Civil War battles
 Bull Run, Fairfax County, Virginia, a census-designated place west of Centreville, east of the stream; See U.S. Route 29 in Virginia
 Bull Run, Prince William County, Virginia, a census-designated place northwest of Manassas, west of the stream
 Bull Run Mountain Estates, Virginia, a census-designated place in Prince William County, southwest of the stream
 Bull Run Regional Park, on the stream in Fairfax County
 Bull Run Mountains, a mountain range in Fauquier, Loudoun, and Prince William counties

Elsewhere
 Bull Run Mountains (Nevada), a mountain range in Elko County
 Bull Run (Deep River tributary), a stream in Guilford County, North Carolina
 Bull Run River (Oregon)
 Bull Run Lake, a reservoir, an impoundment of the river
 Bull Run Hydroelectric Project, a former dam project on the river
 Bull Run, Oregon, an unincorporated community named for the river
 Bull Run National Forest, a former national forest
 Bull Run Creek, a stream in South Dakota
 Bull Run Fossil Plant also known as Bull Run Steam Plant, a coal-fired electric generating station owned by the Tennessee Valley Authority

Entertainment
 Bull Run (novel), a young adult novel by Paul Fleischman about the First Battle of Bull Run
 The Battles of Bull Run, a 1973 board wargame that simulates both battles of Bull Run
 Bullrun Rally, an automobile rally in North America
 Bull running, a defunct event once common in England, in which townsfolk chased down a bull then slaughtered it
 Stamford bull run, the last surviving such event, ending in 1839
 Tutbury bull run
 Running of the bulls, events in Spain, Portugal, France, and Mexico, in which people run in front of a number of bulls, often used in bullfighting after the run

Other uses
 Bull market or bull run, a rising market trend in economics

See also